Heritage is an album by American jazz trumpeter Eddie Henderson recorded in 1976 and released on the Blue Note label.

Reception
The Allmusic review by Thom Jurk awarded the album 3½ stars stating "Heritage is a wonderful set, and should be revisited by anyone who either missed or was put off by it initially. For the new generation of jazz and funk heads, this one is right up your alley -- these are some dark, freaky, and delicious grooves that bear further investigation".

Track listing
''Compositions by Eddie Henderson except as indicated;
 "Inside You" (James Mtume) - 4:52 
 "Acuphuncture" (Julian Priester) - 3:44 
 "Time and Space" - 5:19 
 "Nostalgia" (Pat O'Hearn) - 4:12 
 "Kudu" (Patrice Rushen) - 6:08 
 "Dr. Mganga" (Brent Rampone) - 7:33 
 "Dark Shadows" - 6:54
Recorded at Wally Heider Sound Studios in San Francisco, California on April 2, 1976.

Personnel
Eddie Henderson - trumpet, flugelhorn
Julian Priester - trombone, bass trombone
Hadley Caliman - soprano saxophone, bass clarinet, flute
Patrice Rushen - electric piano, clavinet, synthesizer
Paul Jackson - electric bass
Mike Clark (tracks 1–5), Woody Theus (tracks 6 & 7), Billy Hart (track 7) - drums
Mtume - conga, percussion

References 

1976 albums
Albums recorded at Wally Heider Studios
Blue Note Records albums
Eddie Henderson (musician) albums
Jazz-funk albums